The Silver Greyhound is a 1932 British thriller film directed by William C. McGann and starring Percy Marmont, Anthony Bushell and Janice Adair. The film is a quota quickie, made at Teddington Studios by the British subsidiary of the Hollywood company Warner Brothers.

Cast
 Percy Marmont as Norton Fitzwarren  
 Anthony Bushell as Gerald Varrick  
 Janice Adair as Ira Laennic  
 Harry Hutchinson as Regan  
 J.A. O'Rourke as O'Brien  
 Dino Galvani as Valdez  
 Eric Stanley as Valdez

References

Bibliography
 Low, Rachael. Filmmaking in 1930s Britain. George Allen & Unwin, 1985.
 Wood, Linda. British Films, 1927-1939. British Film Institute, 1986.

External links

1932 films
Films directed by William C. McGann
1930s comedy thriller films
British comedy thriller films
Films shot at Teddington Studios
Warner Bros. films
British black-and-white films
1932 comedy films
1930s English-language films
1930s British films
Quota quickies